The Klindworth-Scharwenka Conservatory was a music institute in Berlin, established in 1893, which for decades (until 1960) was one of the most internationally renowned schools of music. It was formed from the existing schools of music of Xaver Scharwenka and Karl Klindworth, the Scharwenka-Konservatorium and the Klindworth-Musikschule. The former, with his brother Phillipp, consolidated the two.

Directors
1881–1892: Xaver Scharwenka (Scharwenka-Konservatorium)
1890–1892: Friedrich Wilhelm Langhans (Scharwenka-Konservatorium) 
1883–1892: Karl Klindworth (Klindworth-Musikschule) 
1893–1905: Hugo Goldschmidt 
1893–1917: Philipp Scharwenka 
1898–1924: Xaver Scharwenka 
1905–1917: Robert Robitschek 
1929–?: Max Dawison
1937–1954: Walter Scharwenka

Teachers
 Conrad Ansorge
 Wilhelm Berger
 Fritz von Borries
 Sergei Bortkiewicz
 Gustav Bumcke
 Max Butting
 Hugo van Dalen
 Hanns Eisler
 Harald Genzmer
 Alfred von Glehn
 Bruno Henze
 Wladimir Horbowski
 Wolfgang Jacobi
 Alberto Jonás
 Hugo Kaun
 Leo Kestenberg
 Walter Kirchhoff
 James Kwast
 Télémaque Lambrino
 Hugo Leichtentritt
 Jacques van Lier
 Moritz Mayer-Mahr
 Florizel von Reuter
 Helmut Roloff
 Nino Rossi
 Marie Schmidtlein
 Else Streit
 Alfred Szendrei
 James Simon
 Hans-Joachim Vetter
 Wladimir Vogel

Students
 Siegfried Behrend
 John Victor Bergquist
 Theodor Bohlmann
 Paul Dessau
 Rodolfo Holzmann
 Otto Klemperer
 Margarete Klose
 Max Janowski
 Adalbert Luczkowski
 Rudolf Müller-Chappuis
 Lotar Olias
 Helmut Schmidt
 Jascha Spivakovsky
 Anna Suszczynska

References

Music schools in Germany
Defunct schools in Berlin
Music in Berlin